Fujinami Dam is a rockfill dam located in Fukuoka Prefecture in Japan. The dam is used for flood control. The catchment area of the dam is 21.7 km2. The dam impounds about 21  ha of land when full and can store 2950 thousand cubic meters of water. The construction of the dam was started on 1970 and completed in 2009.

References

Dams in Fukuoka Prefecture
2009 establishments in Japan